Thomas Hardy Statue is a statue of Thomas Hardy, located at Dorchester, Dorset, England. It was funded by public subscription to commemorate Hardy's life and works, three years after his death. Designed by Eric Kennington, the statue was unveiled on 2 September 1931 by Sir James Matthew Barrie. It has been a Grade II listed monument since 1950.

References

Outdoor sculptures in England
Grade II listed buildings in Dorset
Monuments and memorials in Dorset
Cultural infrastructure completed in 1931
1931 sculptures
Bronze sculptures in the United Kingdom
Hardy, Thomas
Thomas Hardy